The Red Peacock (German: Arme Violetta) is a 1920 German silent film directed by Paul L. Stein and starring Pola Negri and Victor Varconi. It was shot at the Tempelhof Studios and distributed by UFA. Long thought lost, the film was rediscovered in a New York basement in 2020.

Cast
 Pola Negri as Violetta Duclos 
 Alexander Antalffy as Gaston  
 Paul Biensfeldt as Alfred's father  
 Michael Bohnen 
 Ernst Bringolf 
 Guido Herzfeld as Violetta's father  
 Paul Otto as Graf von Geray  
 Greta Schröder as Alfred's sister  
 Victor Varconi as Alfred Germont  
 Marga von Kierska as Flora

References

Bibliography
 Mariusz Kotowski. Pola Negri: Hollywood's First Femme Fatale. University Press of Kentucky, 2014.

External links

1920 films
Films of the Weimar Republic
Films directed by Paul L. Stein
German silent feature films
UFA GmbH films
Films set in France
German black-and-white films
Films shot at Tempelhof Studios